The 1938 Army Cadets football team represented the United States Military Academy in the 1938 college football season. In their first year under head coach William H. Wood, the Cadets compiled an 8–2 record and outscored their opponents by a combined total of 243 to 95.  In the annual Army–Navy Game, the Cadets defeated the Midshipmen by a 14 to 7 score. The Cadets' two losses came against Columbia and Notre Dame, and were unranked in the AP poll.
 
No Army players were recognized on the All-America team.

Schedule

References

Army
Army Black Knights football seasons
Army Cadets football